A chief revenue officer (CRO) is a corporate officer (executive)  responsible for all revenue generation processes in an organization. In this role, a CRO is accountable for driving better integration and alignment between all revenue-related functions, including marketing, sales, customer support, pricing, and revenue management.

Roles and functions 
In short, a CRO is responsible for all activities that generate revenue. In most companies, the CRO is tasked with primary or shared responsibility for operations, sales, corporate development, marketing, pricing, and revenue management. Since these functions extend across multiple teams in most companies, a good CRO must maintain an excellent communication framework across the various organizational functions and share best practices among the revenue stream managers in order to maximize revenue production.

Like with any corporate officer, the performance of a CRO must be evaluated to ensure maximum return to the company and its shareholders. Performance metrics should focus on the following areas:
 Sales performance: Sales strategies and tactics should aim to sell each product to the most valuable segment with a focus on generating the most revenue possible
 Product creation: Micro-markets should be properly identified and segmented, with products created or defined for each
 Pricing strategies: Prices for each product should correlate with each micro-market’s perceived value of that product and ensure product availability is restricted to the micro-market that generates the highest return
 Pricing execution: A firm must have tools and processes for determining optimal prices that align product value with specific market segments
 Advertising and promotion effectiveness: Expenditures on marketing and advertising activities must generate revenue and be analyzed and refined to isolate the activities generate the greatest ROI
 Distribution effectiveness: All possible channels must be evaluated to identify the channels that provide the most effective and profitable means of distribution 
 Delivery: The quality of revenue generation activities should positively affect the ability of the company to maximize revenue
 Customer satisfaction: Corporate communication processes should maintain a complete customer feedback loop to ensure customer satisfaction

The CRO profile 
There are a few key personal and professional attributes that define a successful Chief Revenue Officer:

 Results-oriented: A CRO assumes a long-term, integrated perspective while also striving to drive quarterly revenue results – he or she commits to short-term results, forecasts future revenue, and takes accountability for both short-term success and longer-term strategy

 Market maker: A CRO works closely with the executive team and others to craft and communicate the company’s vision and then transform that vision into a long-term strategy for pioneering new markets and opportunities
 Leading from the front: A CRO must be able to see and clearly communicate the company vision and the revenue strategy across all relevant functions and ensure the right goals are defined and met 
 Business acumen: As a business leader first, a CRO must regularly measure and analyze productivity and effectiveness, form strategic product road maps, create market positioning and competitive advantages, and determine budget trade-offs with a goal of continually improving and developing sustainable results
 Data-driven / metrics-driven: The right CRO creates a culture of accountability by setting the right metrics and tying company performance, compensation and promotions to tangible results
 Wise arbiter: The best CROs understand and embrace the differences between marketing and sales, while at the same time establishing processes to ensure their coordination across the full revenue cycle to ensure the greatest revenue growth possible

References

Titles